My Friend Dahmer is a 2017 American biographical psychological drama film written and directed by Marc Meyers about American serial killer Jeffrey Dahmer. The film is based on the 2012 graphic novel of the same name by cartoonist John "Derf" Backderf, who had been friends with Dahmer in high school in the 1970s, until the time Dahmer began his killing spree in 1978. The film stars Ross Lynch as Dahmer, Alex Wolff as Derf, Dallas Roberts as Jeffrey's father, and Anne Heche as Jeffrey's mother.

The film premiered at the 2017 Tribeca Film Festival and was released in the United States on November 3, 2017, by Hulu.

The film received generally positive reviews, with critics praising the historical accuracy and Lynch's performance.

Plot
In 1974, Jeffrey Dahmer is a high school freshman living in Bath, Ohio, with his parents, Lionel and Joyce, and his younger brother Dave. Jeffrey develops an obsession with a male jogger whom he sees every day from his school bus. For a hobby, Jeffrey collects dead animals that he dissolves to the bones using chemicals provided by his father, who is a chemist. This hobby is initiated by his obsessive interest in how animals are "fitted together".

In 1978, Lionel trashes Jeffrey's collection of bones and orders him to make friends at school. During school, Jeffrey imitates the speech and gestures of his mother's interior decorator (who has cerebral palsy), clears his backpack, and makes loud noises, catching the attention of aspiring artist John "Derf" Backderf and his friends.  Jeffrey inspires Derf to draw him in various situations; drawings that would later be incorporated into Derf's graphic novel My Friend Dahmer.  Derf and his friends form the "Dahmer Fan Club," using Jeffrey for a variety of pranks such as sneaking him in every club yearbook photo, and conning their way to a meeting with then Vice President Walter Mondale during a school field trip to Washington, D.C.

Meanwhile, Joyce starts relapsing into chronic mental illness, leading to increasingly bitter fights between her and Lionel. To cope, Jeffrey turns to drinking heavily, and begins killing animals himself.

The jogger with whom Jeffrey is obsessed turns out to be Dr. Matthews, the physician of one of Derf's friends. Jeffrey fakes a cold so that he can get an appointment with him, and he can examine Jeffrey naked. Dr. Matthews becomes uncomfortable during the hernia exam when he notices that Jeffrey has an erection. When Jeffrey returns home, he retires to his room and masturbates to the incident. The following night, Jeffrey fantasizes about having sex with Dr. Matthews' corpse. He starts stalking Dr. Matthews with a baseball bat, but never goes through with attacking him.

Jeffrey's father moves out while Jeffrey is away on a field trip.  After the trip, Jeffrey makes some attempts to stay connected to his friends such as bringing a date to the prom, but ultimately drifts away from them. At graduation, Lionel hands Jeffrey the keys to the family Volkswagen Beetle which he would later use to commit his first murder. Unbeknownst to Lionel, Joyce leaves Ohio to live with relatives in Wisconsin, taking Dave with her and leaving Jeffrey completely alone.

That evening, Derf spots Jeffrey walking home alone, with blood on his fingernails. Derf offers a ride to Jeffrey, finding him living alone with no plans for the future.  Derf tells him that he is leaving for college the following day and offers him his drawings of Jeffrey, which he declines. He menacingly invites Derf inside for a beer, but Derf turns him down. As Derf walks back to his car, Jeffrey picks up a baseball bat and is about to strike him with it, although he later puts it down. As Derf gets in the car and drives home, he notices the bat. Jeffrey never has contact with his high school friends again.

The next morning, Jeffrey drives around and picks up hitchhiker Steven Hicks from a concert. The closing credits note that Hicks was never seen again and that Jeffrey Dahmer admitted to killing 17 men when he was finally arrested in 1991.

Cast
 Ross Lynch as Jeffrey Dahmer, Lionel and Joyce's son, who has obsessive fantasies of rape, cannibalism, and necrophilia.
 Alex Wolff as John "Derf" Backderf, Dahmer's closest friend and an aspiring graphic artist
 Vincent Kartheiser as Dr. Matthews
 Anne Heche as Joyce Dahmer, Lionel's wife and Jeffrey's mother
 Dallas Roberts as Lionel Dahmer, Joyce's husband and Jeffrey's father
 Tommy Nelson as Neil Davis, one of Dahmer and Backderf's friends
 Harrison Holzer as Mike, one of Dahmer and Backderf's friends
 Cameron McKendry as Moose, the bully at Jeffrey's high school
 Miles Robbins as Lloyd Figg
 Liam Koeth as Dave Dahmer, Jeffrey's brother
 Lily Kozub as freshman girl, the girl Jeffrey took to the high school prom
 Dave Sorboro as Steven Hicks

Production
The script appeared on 2014's Black List.

Ross Lynch was cast as the teenage Dahmer in 2016. Lynch had previously been employed as a teen actor by the Disney Channel, most notably starring in the show Austin & Ally. John Backderf, the author of the graphic novel, was enthusiastic about this casting against type, stating that Lynch's performance would make viewers "uncomfortable because it's so familiar". Later in the month Alex Wolff, Vincent Kartheiser and Anne Heche joined the cast, with Heche playing Dahmer's mother.

Filming took place in Bath, Ohio, and Middleburg Heights, Ohio. Scenes depicting Dahmer's home life were filmed in Dahmer's actual childhood home in Ohio. Actors in the movie said that it was very strange to be in the home where the serial killer lived. They also mentioned that the house is where Dahmer's pathology began.

In comparison to the comic, Derf is added into scenes in the movie that he was not actually present at, including the fishing scene, the DC trip, and the prom. It was also Derf, not Neil, who felt bad about the mall incident. Most prominently, it was Neil who gave Dahmer the final ride home, not Derf, and it was likely right after Hicks’ murder, not before.

Release
My Friend Dahmer premiered at the 2017 Tribeca Film Festival on April 21, 2017. On May 15, 2017, FilmRise acquired distribution rights to the film, planning to release it in the fall.  The film was released in limited theaters on November 3, 2017, with a wider release the following month.

Reception

Critical response
On the review aggregator website Rotten Tomatoes, the film has an 86% rating based on 105 reviews, with an average rating of 7/10. The website's critical consensus reads, "My Friend Dahmer opens a window into the making of a serial killer whose conclusions are as empathetic as they are deeply troubling." Metacritic, another review aggregator, assigned the film a weighted average score of 68 out of 100, based on 26 critics, indicating "generally favorable reviews".

Box office 
My Friend Dahmer had a budget around $1.5M.

See also
 The Secret Life: Jeffrey Dahmer – A 1993 biographical crime drama film (starring Carl Crew).
 Dahmer – A 2002 biographical true crime horror film (starring Jeremy Renner).
 The Jeffrey Dahmer Files – A 2012 independent documentary film.
 Dahmer – Monster: The Jeffrey Dahmer Story- A 10-part biographical crime drama series that was commissioned by Netflix and released on September 21, 2022. Evan Peters portrayed Dahmer.

References

External links
 
 
 
 

2017 films
2017 horror films
2017 biographical drama films
2017 horror thriller films
American biographical drama films
American horror thriller films
American psychological drama films
Drama films based on actual events
Horror films based on actual events
American horror drama films
Biographical films about serial killers
Films about Jeffrey Dahmer
Films based on American comics
Films based on American novels
Films set in the 1970s
Films set in the 1980s
Films shot in Ohio
Live-action films based on comics
2017 LGBT-related films
American LGBT-related films
Gay-related films
LGBT-related films based on actual events
2017 drama films
LGBT-related horror films
Films directed by Marc Meyers
Biographical films about criminals
Films set in Ohio
2010s English-language films
2010s American films
2010s psychological drama films